Cassington Halt was a single platform halt opened by the Great Western Railway on 9 March 1936 on the Oxford, Witney and Fairford Railway to serve the village of Cassington, Oxfordshire, just south of the A40.

History
Cassington Halt was opened by the Great Western Railway on 9 March 1936. It had a single  platform and was unstaffed. As the platform could not accommodate a full train, passengers alighting here had to travel in the last coach (in the case of Down trains) or the front coach (in the case of Up trains). An instruction was issued to guards to travel in the front coach of Up services between Eynsham and  so that fares could be collected from passengers joining the train.

The halt, which was the penultimate station to be opened on the Witney Railway, had a precast concrete platform on which was a traditional wooden shelter with a saw-tooth awning. It was lit by oil lamps which were trimmed and extinguished by the guards of trains calling at the halt. The station was located on the south side of the A40 road which was carried over the line by a traditional Cotswold stone bridge. Following the Second World War, the halt was resited to the north side of the A40 bridge to allow passengers to reach it via a private road rather than having to cross the busy road.

British Railways closed the station on 18 June 1962. Full closure of the line did not come until Monday 2 November 1970.

Present day
The trackbed has been concreted over to provide an access road to the sand extraction sites in the area.

Reopening the railway
There is a strong case to reopen the railway given the severe traffic congestion on the roads to and from Oxford.

References

Notes

Sources

External links
Photos and pictures of the halt
 Station on 1947 OS Map
Archived page with post-closure details of stations

Former Great Western Railway stations
Disused railway stations in Oxfordshire
West Oxfordshire District
Railway stations in Great Britain opened in 1936
Railway stations in Great Britain closed in 1962